My 20 may refer to:
KTXH-TV Houston, Texas (O&O)
WDCA-TV Washington, D.C. (O&O)
KTVD Denver, Colorado
KWKB Iowa City, Iowa
WMYD Detroit, Michigan (2006 to 2021)